The third Asian Athletics Championships were held in 1979 in Tokyo, Japan.

Medal summary

Men's events

Women's events

Medal table

External links
GBR Athletics

Asian Athletics Championships
Asian
Asian Championships in Athletics
Asian Championships in Athletics
Asian Championships in Athletics
A
Asian Champion
International athletics competitions hosted by Japan
Athletics in Tokyo